Platoon Leader is a 1988 war film set in the Vietnam War and directed by Aaron Norris; it stars Michael Dudikoff and Michael DeLorenzo and was filmed in South Africa. It is loosely based on James R. McDonough's memoir of the same name. It is the only movie directed by Aaron Norris not to star his brother Chuck Norris.

The film is about a newly commissioned infantry lieutenant who arrives in Vietnam to take over his first platoon. He finds he has to prove himself and earn the trust of the enlisted men if he is to lead them.

Plot
Lt. Jeffrey Knight, a new officer from the United States Military Academy, is airlifted to an outpost in Vietnam, where he meets his platoon, a group of tough-witted veterans of the war. Platoon Sergeant McNamara explains to Knight that the platoon does not need a leader that follows rules. Lt. Knight's actions are also frowned upon by all of his men except for Pvt. Parker, the radio operator.

On one of his first patrols, Knight stumbles carelessly over a trip mine and is nearly killed. Parker then radios for an evac and McNamara orders the troops to move to an LZ for an extraction. Later, while Lt. Knight is recovering from his wounds in an Army hospital, Major Flynn asks him if he is able to take command again and Knight agrees. Knight is airlifted back to his platoon's outpost but is not greeted by his men and finds his gear missing from his quarters, as they did not expect him to return. When they realize Knight has returned, the soldiers rush to return his property outside his office before he comes back out.  Knight realizes that he must take a different approach to have his men's respect.

Back on patrol, the platoon is attacked by heavy Vietcong (VC) forces and Parker is hit by mortar fire. Knight calls up his Medic to save Parker, but Parker's wounds are mortal and he dies in Knight's arms. McNamara then arrives with his squad and the group repels the enemy who retreats towards Sergeant Roach, who carries a shotgun and is considered the platoon's toughest soldier. Roach then kills the remaining VC easily. A week later, Major Flynn gives Knight 3 new replacements including a rebellious Private named Don Pike. Knight finds Pike's demeanor disruptive and sends him to Sergeant Roach's mine sweeping detail. Roach then has Pike hold his trigger finger on a live mine while Roach takes a break to urinate. Later, Knight finds Private Bacera getting high in his barracks when he was supposed to be leaving on patrol. Knight confronts Bacera and dumps out the drugs he found and personally leads the patrol the next day, keeping a close eye on Bacera. Even so, Bacera sneaks a hit when recusing himself to urinate. Knight finds Bacera expired with a needle still in his arm, having suddenly overdosed, causing Knight to be angry with himself.

Late at night, Knight wakes to find an enemy in the camp, killing him and alerting the men that the outpost will be attacked. The platoon prepares for the attack and shoots off flares to illuminate the battlefield showing the VC advancing on them with an enormous force. The base is hit hard. Sergeant Hayes uses his claymores and Knight calls for an airstrike to repel the enemy, but the platoon suffers heavy casualties in fending off the attack.

The next morning, Knight confesses that he feels that he can't be a leader, but McNamara tells him that he got them this far and can do the rest. Knight is then met by Captain Killinski, Lt. Riley and another Lt. Captain Killinsky explains the rest of the VC battalion they fought off during the night is nearby, and outlines a plan to attack the enemy. Knight counters with an idea he believes work better, and after consulting with the other two Lieutenants, Killinsky agrees to the new plan, trusting in Knight's experience.

Knight's platoon moves to their position in the jungle and Knight orders McNamara to scout ahead to bring another platoon into position. McNamera is ambushed before reaching the other platoon and severely injured.  Knight and his squad fight to reach McNamera and bring him to an LZ to evac him via helicopter. Captain Killinski tells Knight that a company of VC slipped through and are attacking the village. Knight's platoon arrives at the village and kill off the VC company. The platoon is then attacked by Mortar fire and Knight is hit by shrapnel, damaging his eye, but Sergeant Roach applies first aid. Roach brings a baby from one of the destroyed huts and explains the VC were after the villagers not the soldiers.

After the battle, Knight visits McNamara and sees he's okay. He explains to him they lost the village, but they fought off the VC. He then says that he's starting to understand the meaning of this war and lets McNamara rest. A couple months later, McNamara returns to the base with Knight greeting him saying "welcome back to the country club" as they embrace.

Cast
 Michael Dudikoff as Lieutenant Jeffrey Knight
 Robert F. Lyons as Sergeant Michael McNamara
 Michael DeLorenzo as Private Raymond Bacera
 Jesse Dabson as Private Joshua Parker
 Rick Fitts as Sergeant Robert Hayes
 Tony Pierce as Private Jan Schultz
 Daniel Demorest as Private Duffy
 Brian Libby as Sergeant "Roach"
 Michael Rider as Private Don Pike
 William Smith as Major Flynn
 Al Karaki as Private Kemp
 Evan J. Klisser as Private Larsen
 Evan Barker as Captain Klinski
 A.J. Smith as Lieutenant Riley
 Dean Raphael Ferrandini as Medic 
 Willie Olmstead as Medic (as Bill Olmstead)
 Themi Venturis as New Lieutenant
 Raymond Phoenix as Lieutenant
 Joyce Long as Mother With Child

Box Office release
Platoon Leader was released on October 1, 1988 and made $1.349 million in the United States.

Critical reception
The film received mixed reviews, including criticism for being an imitation of Oliver Stone's 1986 war drama Platoon. After the film's DVD release in December 2017, Cinapse film review writer Ed Travis acknowledged the film's ambitions in terms of its direction and production. Travis also praised the film's leading man Michael Dudikoff "for turning in the best performance of his career by a substantial margin." He also wrote "There's absolutely no surprises. Nor is there really much of a hook. I guess the "point" is that leaders are made on the battlefield and not in the classroom. Or that being "in the shit" is what truly makes the man. The problem is that the viewer never for one second believes that Lt. Knight won't become the man his men need him to be. It's all very pre-determined and becomes a fairly dry watch with little to cause one to invest in the drama, while also eschewing lots of the Cannon Films trademark excess," and ended his review stating "At worst, it's boring. At best, it's sincere!" In that same month, Austin Trunick of Under the Radar Magazine wrote a similarly mixed review of the film writing "Do come in prepared for some of the usual chest-beating and flag-waving of the subgenre; the Viet Cong are treated mostly as faceless baddies only there to be blown up and shot up en masse in gratuitous slow motion. Expect bullets to hit three enemies at once, and single grenades to explode multiple times and in different locations." He also lent praise to Dudikoff's superior performance compared to Cannon films' contract star Chuck Norris; also known for his 1988 post-Vietnam War action film Braddock: Missing in Action III.

References

External links
 
 
 
 

1988 films
1980s war films
Vietnam War films
Films directed by Aaron Norris
Films scored by George S. Clinton
Golan-Globus films
Films based on biographies
Films shot in South Africa
War films based on actual events
1980s English-language films